Crush is a 2009 Russian romance film directed by Pyotr Buslov, Aleksey German Jr., Kirill Serebrennikov, Ivan Vyrypaev and Boris Khlebnikov.

Plot 
The film tells five different love stories.

Cast 
 Irina Butanaeva as Olya (segment "Pozor")
 Yuriy Chursin
 Ivan Dobronravov
 Aleksey Filimonov
 Andrey Fomin
 Karolina Gruszka as Her
 Aleksandr Ilin as Sailor
 Vitaliy Khaev	
 Yekaterina Kuzminskaya
 Yuliya Peresild

References

External links 
 

2009 films
2000s Russian-language films
2009 romantic drama films
Russian romantic drama films